William Francis Ganong, M.A.,  Ph.D., LL.D., F.R.S.C., (19 February 1864 - 7 September 1941) was a Canadian biologist botanist, historian and cartographer. His botany career was spent mainly as a professor at Smith College in Northampton, Massachusetts. In his private life he contributed to the historical and geographical understanding of his native New Brunswick.

Early life and education
He was born in Carleton (now West Saint John), New Brunswick, in 1864, the eldest of seven children. He is the brother of Susie, Arthur, Edwin, and Kit Ganong Whidden. At the age of seven, the family moved to St. Stephen where his father, James Harvey Ganong and uncle Gilbert Ganong established the now-famous Ganong Brothers candy factory. It was expected that young William would enter the family business when he came of age, but early on, he showed an interest in the natural world. These interests extended to botany, reading, maps, and exploring the countryside. He also showed a talent for languages. Through his life he would come to have at least a working knowledge of French, German, Maliseet and Mi'kmaq. He was an early naturalist and by the age of seventeen, he had first-hand knowledge of numerous rivers and coastal areas of New Brunswick as well as the flora and fauna of the province. His explorations would continue throughout his life, both on his own and with one or more companions including Arthur H. Pierce, Mauran I. Furbish and George Upham Hay.

He attended the University of New Brunswick where he received a Bachelor of Arts degree in 1884 and his master's degree in 1886. The next year, he went to Boston where in 1887, he received an A.B. from Harvard University. He obtained a doctorate in biology from the University of Munich in 1894 and published two papers in the German language. It was probably at Harvard that he met Jean Murray Carman, sister of his friend and fellow Harvard student, New Brunswick poet Bliss Carman. They married in 1888. The marriage lasted thirty-two years until her death in 1920. They had no children.

Career in botany
After graduating from Harvard, Ganong was appointed an assistant instructor in botany there. He stayed at Harvard for a few years until May 1894, when he accepted an appointment as Professor of Botany at Smith College. It was a position he would fill for 36 years. He was also director of the Botanic Garden at Smith. Ganong , was responsible for developing the Garden, which had been laid out by Frederick Law Olmsted in 1893. Ganong expanded and revised Olmsted's planting specifications to make the entire campus an arboretum, and they reworked the herbaceous beds as a "systematics garden" after the Engler-Prantl classification system. The outdoor environment at Smith thus became (and remains) a place of learning for students of botany and horticulture.

By authoring several books including The Teaching Botanist, A Laboratory Manual for Plant Physiology, The Living Plant, and A Textbook of Botany for Colleges, Ganong was able to establish and maintain an international reputation in botany. Under his administration, Smith's Botany department reached a peak in student enrollment, size of staff, and number of courses. He ensured that the range and quality of equipment available to students was high, and the department was able to attain a positive academic reputation. Enrollment in the introductory elective class peaked at 182 in 1926. Dr. Ganong retired from Smith College in 1932.

He was elected President of the Botanical Society of America in 1907.

Historian and cartographer
Ganong undertook historical work during his teaching career. In summers, he would return to New Brunswick to study and document the historical geography of the province. Among his surveys were St. Croix Island, site of Champlain's first settlement in North America in 1604.

He acquired a working knowledge of the Maliseet and Mi'kmaq languages, and with that understanding and consultation with linguists and native historians, he undertook an investigation of the aboriginal place names in the Maritime Provinces, publishing a series of six articles in the Transactions of the Royal Society of Canada between 1911 and 1928. In 1889 he presented a paper on the cartography of the Gulf of Saint Lawrence from the 1530s to 1604. Later, in the 1930s, he published an additional nine articles in the Transactions on what he termed the crucial maps in the early cartography and place-nomenclature of the region. The articles were drawn together and published in book form by the University of Toronto Press in 1964. His work on place-nomenclature is still widely referenced. In his explorations, he also had a chance to name several geographical features in the largely unexplored central and northern parts of New Brunswick, including Mount Carleton, the highest summit in the province, which he named after the first Lieutenant-Governor of New Brunswick, Thomas Carleton. Another mountain to the north of Mount Carleton was named for Ganong in 1901 by his friend and naturalist Mauran Furbish.

As a scientist, Ganong brought a special quality to the study of New Brunswick history, which featured an emphasis on map-based studies and in determining the exact location of key historic sites. He actually went to the places he wrote about. As a translator and editor of the 17th-century Acadian narratives of Nicolas Denys and Father Chrétien Le Clercq he became a foremost scholar of the Acadian period. He frequently contributed articles on Samuel de Champlain to publications of the New Brunswick Historical Society, the New Brunswick Magazine and Acadiensis. In addition to document-based research and translation, Ganong prepared maps, took photographs and gave slide presentations. He often collaborated with others. One frequent collaborator was Dr. John Clarence Webster, for whom he prepared numerous maps and other contributions. He also took a great interest in the international border between New Brunswick and Maine. Because of this interest and expertise he was asked to take part in the cross-border tercentennial celebrations on the St. Croix River in 1904. In 1918, Ganong completed the translation of Volume III of Champlain's Voyages, part of a major publication of Champlain's writings by the Champlain Society. He was also the first to pose a scientific explanation for the often sighted Ghost Ship of Northumberland Strait suggesting it was an electrical illusion.

William F. Ganong's efforts also formed a substantial basis for the establishment of the New Brunswick Museum and archives.

Ganong's second marriage was to Anna Hobbet from Iowa. The couple had two children, William Francis Ganong Jr., a renowned physiologist, and Ann Ganong Seidler, professor of speech theory (now retired) and children's author. Ganong died at his summer home outside Saint John in 1941. He was 77.

Honours
PhD, University of New Brunswick, 1898
LLD, University of New Brunswick, 1920
Fellow of the Royal Society of Canada
William Ganong Hall, Science Building on the Saint John Campus of the University of New Brunswick is named after him.
Ganong Mountain in northern New Brunswick was named for him in 1901.

Publications

Botany
The Teaching Botanist (Macmillan, 1899)
A Laboratory Manual for Plant Physiology (1901)
The Living Plant (1913)
A textbook of botany for colleges (1917 and later editions)

History and geography (partial list)
A Genealogy of the New Brunswick Branch of the Descendants of Thomas Ganong (1893)
 "A Monograph on the Place - Nomenclature of the Province of New Brunswick", in Transactions of the Royal Society of Canada (1896)
"A Monograph of Historic Sites in the Province of New Brunswick", in Transactions of the Royal Society of Canada, Section II (1899)
"Additions and Corrections to Monographs on the Place - Nomenclature, Cartography, Historic Sites, Boundaries and Settlement - origins of the Province of New Brunswick", Transactions of the Royal Society of Canada (1906).
"The Identity of Plants and Animals mentioned by the Early Voyages to Eastern Canada and Newfoundland" in Transactions of the Royal Society of Canada (1909)The Description and Natural History of the Coast of North America(Acadia) by Nicolas Denys Translator (Toronto, 1908)le Clercq: New Relation of Gaspesia Editor (Toronto, 1910)An Organization of the Scientific Investigation of the Indian Place-Nomenclature of the Maritime Provinces of Canada, (3 volumes 1911-13)
 "Ste. Croix (Dochet) Island A Monograph", from Transactions of the Royal Society of Canada, Second series - 1902-1903, Volume VIII, Section II. Edited by Susan Brittain Ganong, B.Sc., LL.D., Monographic Series No. 3, The New Brunswick Museum, Saint John, N.B. (1945).The History of Miscou and Shippegan (1946)Champlain's Island: An Expanded Edition of Ste. Croix (Dochet) Island (1945, Reprinted 2004) 
The History of Caraquet and Pokemouche, Revised and Enlarged from the Author's Manuscript Notes, edited by Susan Brittain Ganong. (Historical Studies No.6. New Brunswick Museum (1948)
The history of Miscou, Tracadie, Pokemouche, Caraquet, Tabusintac, [Shippegan], Neguac and Burnt Church: Settlements in the Province of New Brunswick
Catalogue of the Maps in the Collection of the Geographic Board, (Ottawa: January, 1949)
Crucial Maps in the Early Cartography and Place-nomenclature of the Atlantic Coast of Canada (Royal Society of Canada and the University of Toronto Press, 1964).
A Monograph of the Evolution of the Boundaries of the Province of New Brunswick

References and further reading
Story of the Smith College Botanic Garden
Ganong Fonds, Universite du Moncton
Smith College Archives
Brief biography by Alan Rayburn
Ruby Cusack article, Maritime Men
 Allison Mitcham, Three Remarkable Maritimers 
 J.C. Webster, ed., William Francis Ganong Memorial, (Saint John: New Brunswick Museum, 1942)
 Mary Jo Sanger,William Francis Ganong: Regional Historian,  M.A. Thesis, History, University of Maine, 1980.
 W. Austin Squires, The History and Development of the New Brunswick Museum (Saint John, 1945).
 Graeme Wynn, "W.F. Ganong, A.H. Clark and the Historical Geography of Maritime Canada", Acadiensis, X, 2 (Spring 1981).
 Ronald Rees, New Brunswick was his Country: the life of William Francis Ganong, Halifax: Nimbus, 2016
 Nicholas Guitard, The Lost Wilderness. Rediscovering W.F. Ganong's News Brunswick, Fredericton: Goose Lane, 2015

On-line publications
Ten publications (from "Our Roots")
Map of St Croix Island
William Francis Ganong’s field trips around the province of New Brunswick

Notes

Canadian cartographers
20th-century Canadian historians
1864 births
1941 deaths
Fellows of the Royal Society of Canada
Botanical Society of America
Harvard University faculty
Smith College faculty
William Francis
Harvard University alumni
Ludwig Maximilian University of Munich alumni
University of New Brunswick alumni
Writers from Saint John, New Brunswick
Persons of National Historic Significance (Canada)
20th-century Canadian male writers
19th-century Canadian botanists
20th-century Canadian botanists
19th-century Canadian non-fiction writers
20th-century Canadian non-fiction writers
Canadian male non-fiction writers